On January 12, 2010, three people were killed and two others critically injured in a workplace shooting at FedEx located in the city of Kennesaw, Georgia. The fourth victim died in from complications of his injuries. The alleged shooter, Jesse J. Warren, was captured and arrested in the incident.

Shooting
The shooter, Jesse James Warren, a former employee, walked into the Penske truck rental business Tuesday afternoon wearing camouflage. He opened fire, shooting five. Four victims were employees, another was a customer. One victim, Van Springer, died at the scene. The other four victims were transported in critical condition to a local hospital. A customer (Jaider Marulanda) died at the hospital, while Roberto Gonzalez, an employee, died the next day, which brought the death toll to three. Joshua Holbrook and Zach Werner were shot multiple times, but survived. Zach later died from complications. Warren was arrested less than a mile away after he left in a red Chevrolet S-10 truck.

Warren was declared incompetent to stand trial, and was indefinitely committed to a mental institution in 2017.

References

2010 active shooter incidents in the United States
Kennesaw, Georgia
2010 murders in the United States
Deaths by firearm in Georgia (U.S. state)
2010 mass shootings in the United States
Mass shootings in the United States
2010 in Georgia (U.S. state)
Workplace violence in the United States
People murdered in Georgia (U.S. state)
Murder in Georgia (U.S. state)
Attacks in the United States in 2010
Mass shootings in Georgia (U.S. state)
January 2010 crimes in the United States